Contla consists of two nearby villages in Tlaxcala, Mexico.

One village is also called San Bernardino Contla or simply San Bernardino, and is located at 

The other village is also called San Miguel Contla or San Miguel, and is located at

References

Populated places in Tlaxcala